The Bešenovo Monastery was a Serb Orthodox monastery on the Fruška Gora mountain in the northern Serbian province of Vojvodina. It was located by the Čikoš stream, in the area of the Bešenovački Prnjavor village. During World War II, the monastery was destroyed in the bombing. At the moment it is being rebuilt.

History
According to legend, the monastery of Bešenovo was founded by Serbian King Stefan Dragutin at the end of the 13th century. The earliest historical records about the monastery date back to 1545, in the Turkish population list. Bešenovo monastery was destroyed in a bombing in 1944, and after World War II its remains have been demolished and stolen. It hasn't been rebuilt since. Before the demolition, a monastery complex consisted of a church, storey quarters on three sides of a church and sheds. Following the reconstruction of the all Monasteries of Fruška Gora, a reconstruction of Bešenovo was announced.

WWII destruction
When Yugoslavia disintegrated during World War II in early April 1941 and the Ustasha were carrying out attacks in Srem area, which also was a part of Pavelic’s Independent State of Croatia, the monks from Vrdnik and Jazak took the relics of the Saint Prince Lazar, Saint Emperor Uroš and Saint Stefan Stiljanovic from those two monasteries to Besenovo. They managed to partially preserve them.

In 1942, the Ustasha looted the Monastery treasury, including the coffins of the three saints and all precious objects they contained. All was taken to Zagreb, and the relics were shaken out of coffins and dispersed across the Monastery. They were saved by professor Radoslav Grujić, who managed to transfer them to the Cathedral Church in Belgrade, with the help of the Germans. Though severely pillaged and unoccupied. All of the monks of Fruska Gora monasteries who failed to flee to Serbia under the rule of General Milan Nedić were arrested by the Ustasha and sent to their death camps. Besenovo stood until 4 May 1944. After the Srem partisans placed their headquarters in the Monastery, upon request of the Ustasha headquarters in Zagreb, the Germans practically razed the monastery to the ground on that day with aerial bombs. A reconstruction was carried out in the 21st century.

See also
Monasteries of Fruška Gora
List of Serb Orthodox monasteries

Gallery

External links
 Official web site of Bešenovo monastery
 Манастир Бешеново (Bešenovo monastery) (Facebook Account)

Monasteries on Fruška Gora
Serbian Orthodox monasteries in Serbia
16th-century establishments in Serbia
Buildings and structures demolished in 1944
1944 disestablishments in Serbia
16th-century Serbian Orthodox church buildings
Buildings and structures destroyed during World War II